Entrepeñas is a reservoir located on the Tagus River in the Alcarria Baja region of Guadalajara, Spain. It was completed in 1956.

Apart from the Tagus, it also receives water from the Valdetrigo, Barranco Grande, Solana, and Ompólveda rivers, among others. The dam structure is situated next to the town of Entrepeñas, from which it took its name, between the municipal districts of Sacedón and Auñón.

The towns of Auñón, Durón, Pareja, and Sacedón are located on the banks of the reservoir, as are the residential areas of Las Anclas, Las Brisas, Peñalagos, and El Paraiso. Entrepeñas forms part of the so-called Sea of Castile (Spanish: Mar de Castilla), together with the reservoirs of Buendía, Bolarque, Zorita, Almoguera, and Estremera.

In conjunction with the Buendía Reservoir, it supplies the Tagus-Segura Water Transfer.

See also 
List of dams and reservoirs in Spain

References 

Reservoirs in Castilla–La Mancha
Dams in Spain
Tagus basin
Dams on the Tagus
Dams completed in 1956